Tadashi Ishimine (伊志嶺 忠, born June 22, 1985 in Nakagami District, Okinawa) is a Japanese professional baseball catcher for the Tohoku Rakuten Golden Eagles in Japan's Nippon Professional Baseball.

External links

NPB.com

1985 births
Japanese baseball players
Living people
Nippon Professional Baseball catchers
Baseball people from Okinawa Prefecture
Tohoku Rakuten Golden Eagles players